Stephen Frank Canneto (born 1943) is an American artist. He predominantly creates large-scale sculptures, many in Columbus, Ohio. Canneto was born in Fort Monmouth, New Jersey.

Works

In Columbus, Ohio

 Crossroads of Commerce at 250 E. Town Street
 Intersect, on Capitol Square
 NavStar '92, at the Franklin Park Conservatory
 Pray for Peace and Pieces to Pieces, at First Community Church
 Quest, at the Ohio Department of Education
 Shamash-Light Tower I, formerly outside Waterford Tower

Outside Columbus
 Spirit of Caring, in Coral Springs, Florida

See also
 List of public art in Columbus, Ohio

References

External links
 

1943 births
Living people
Sculptors from Ohio
Sculptors from New Jersey
People from Monmouth County, New Jersey